In Memory of Nikki Arane is an album of improvised music by Eugene Chadbourne and John Zorn recorded in 1980 but not released on Derek Bailey's Incus Records until 1996. The album is named after a character from Stanley Kubrick's first major feature film The Killing (1956).

Reception
The AllMusic review by Jesse Jarnow awarded the album 3 stars, stating: "Instead playing textural pieces to convey a mood or emotion, the duo create sounds that imitate actions. What actions, of course, are left entirely to the listener -- though they are usually brutally violent or darkly industrial."

Track listing
 "In Memory Of Nikki Arane" - 12:35
 "In Memory Of Nikki Arane"  - 20:18
 "In Memory Of Nikki Arane" - 10:48
 "In Memory Of Nikki Arane" - 18:08

All compositions by Eugene Chadbourne & John Zorn

Personnel
John Zorn – saxophones, clarinets, and game calls
Eugene Chadbourne –  modified acoustic and electric guitars, dobro, and other items

References

John Zorn albums
Eugene Chadbourne albums
Incus Records albums
1996 albums